Bassil Da Costa (Guatire, 7 May 1990 – Caracas, 12 February 2014) was a Venezuelan university student, killed during the 2014 protests against the Venezuelan government, the first death of the wave of protests. Da Costa was a marketing student at the Universidad Alejandro de Humboldt in Caracas.

Death
On 12 February 2014, Youth Day in Venezuela, various parties in opposition to the Venezuelan government and student groups marched in the entire country in protest against the government. In Caracas, the protest march was held from Plaza Venezuela to the Public Ministry's offices in the city's downtown. The demonstration itself went smoothly, but after it was finished conflict arose with a shootout in which Da Costa and Juan Montoya, member of a colectivo, were killed.

On 13 February 2014, President Nicolás Maduro stated Da Costa and Montoya were killed by the same person, and that the murders were part of the violence generated by the opposition on 12 February 2014. The Secretary of the Democratic Unity Roundtable (MUD), the opposition coalition, Ramón Guillermo Aveledo, rejected President Maduro's statements and maintained the protesters were not ill-intended, while hinting at possible government infiltrates in the march.

Investigations
The first investigations made by the Cuerpo de Investigaciones Científicas, Penales y Criminalísticas (CICPC) identified at least three members of the Bolivarian Intelligence Service (SEBIN) who had shot against protesters near the Public Ministry offices the day of the march, amongst them the alleged killer of Da Costa.

Days later, the independent newspaper Últimas Noticias published the results of an investigative work on the murders, in which it claimed to have discovered both men in uniform and civilians had shot against the protesters on the 12th of February. In April 2014, six SEBIN officers were apprehended and the alleged murderer of Da Costa was formally indicted.

The trial on Da Costa and Montoya's murders was delayed in various occasions, until it finally started on 16 June 2015, over a year after they took place.

See also
Génesis Carmona
Timeline of the 2014 Venezuelan protests

Notes

References

1990 births
2014 deaths
People from Caracas
Murdered Venezuelan students
People murdered in Venezuela
Victims of police brutality
2014 murders in Venezuela
Deaths by firearm in Venezuela
People shot dead by law enforcement officers
2014 Venezuelan protests